The Dutch Tweede Divisie in the 1963–64 season was contested by 32 teams, divided in two groups. NEC won the championship after beating Alkmaar '54 in a play-off.

Two teams would be promoted: the winners of the championship play-off and the winners of the following promotion competition. None of the teams relegated to amateur football.

New entrants and group changes

Group A
Entered from the B-group:
HVC
HFC Haarlem
RCH
HVV t' Gooi
FC Hilversum
HFC EDO
PEC

Group B
Relegated from the Eerste Divisie:
Limburgia
Roda JC
Entered from the A-group:
AGOVV Apeldoorn
NEC
Vitesse Arnhem
FC Wageningen
De Graafschap

Final tables

Group A

Group B

Play-offs
Several play-offs were held to determine the league champions, who would be promoted to the Eerste Divisie, and who would leave the Professional leagues altogether.

Championship play-off

NEC were promoted to the Eerste Divisie, while Alkmaar '54 entered the Promotion Tournament.

Group B 3rd-place play-off

Roda JC qualified for the Best 3rd Place play-off owing to a superior Goal Average in the "regular season".

Best 3rd-place play-off

Roda JC entered the promotion tournament.

Promotion tournament
To determine the second team to be promoted. Entering teams:
 the two 2nd-placed from the "regular season",
 the loser of the Championship play-off,
 and the winner of the Best 3rd-place play-off.

Relegation play-off

However, as KFC & Be Quick 1887 both relegated themselves, LONGA retained their spot.

See also
 1963–64 Eredivisie
 1963–64 Eerste Divisie

References
Netherlands - List of final tables (RSSSF)

Tweede Divisie seasons
3
Neth